John W. Bullard Jr. is a retired U.S. Marine brigadier general who served as the commander of the 11th Marine Expeditionary Unit and Commanding General, Marine Corps Installations West - Marine Corps Base Camp Pendleton.

Marine Corps career
Bullard was commissioned in the United States Marine Corps as a second lieutenant in 1983 after graduation from Virginia Tech and Officer Candidate School. He graduated from The Basic School at Marine Corps Base Quantico and received assignment to Naval Air Station Pensacola for flight training. He was designated a Naval Aviator in 1985. His operational assignments include CH-46 training at MCAS New River followed by service with VMM-263, VMM-161 and VMM-774. He deployed with 26th MEU and 24th MEU aboard the USS Guadalcanal where he participated in Operation Earnest Will in 1987.

His staff and command assignments include CH-46 division head, Marine Aviation Weapons and Tactics Squadron 1 from 1989 to 1993; Aviation Combat Element leader for 13th MEU (SOC) aboard USS Essex; Executive Officer of Marine Aircraft Group 16; student, Marine Corps Command and Staff College from 1996 to 1997; Aide-de-Camp to Deputy Commandant for Aviation; Commanding Officer of VMM-161 from May 2000 to December 2001; student, Air War College from 2002 to 2003; Aviation Department's Joint Doctrine, and Budget Branch, HQMC; Plans officer at United States Central Command; Commanding Officer of 11th Marine Expeditionary Unit from May 2005 to June 2008 and Branch Head of Marine Aviation Weapons Systems Requirements Branch for Headquarters Marine Corps. As a general officer, Bullard was Commander of NATO Headquarters Sarajevo; Deputy Commander of Regional Command North in Afghanistan and later Deputy Commanding General, Marine Corps Combat Development Command. His final assignment was Commanding General, Marine Corps Installations West - Marine Corps Base Camp Pendleton from 2012 to 2014.

Awards and decorations

References
Notes

United States Naval Aviators
Recipients of the Air Medal
Recipients of the Defense Superior Service Medal
Recipients of the Legion of Merit
United States Marine Corps generals
United States Marine Corps officers
Recipients of the Meritorious Service Medal (United States)
Year of birth missing (living people)
Living people